EOTS may refer to:

Electro-Optical Targeting System, a military targeting system.
Enema of the State, the third studio album by American pop-punk band Blink-182.
Enemy of the state is a political / criminal term.
Empire of the Sun, a 1984 novel by J. G. Ballard.
Empire of the Sun (film), a film adaptation of the novel.
Empire of the Sun (band), an Australian synthpop duo. 
Employee ownership trusts, a type of employee trust.